Gordon Perry Robertson (born June 4, 1958) is an American televangelist who is the CEO of the Christian Broadcasting Network. He is the main host of The 700 Club, the show founded by his father, Pat Robertson.

Biography
Robertson graduated from The McCallie School in 1976, from Yale in 1980, and afterward from his father's alma mater, Washington and Lee University ("W&L"), with a Juris Doctor degree. Following his graduation from W&L, Robertson practiced law in Norfolk, Virginia, for 10 years. On a short-term mission trip to India, he believes "[God] opened [his] heart to the plight of millions of unreached souls." He responded by leaving his law firm and moving to the Philippines.

In 1988, Robertson and his father, along with Dick Weinhold of the Texas Robertson campaign and Billy McCormack, a Southern Baptist pastor in Shreveport, Louisiana, were named the four directors of the newly organized Christian Coalition of America.

Robertson officially joined his father's CBN in 1994, when the younger Robertson founded CBN Asia, Inc., which included a weekly television show, The 700 Club Asia, with the goal of closely replicating the aspects of the original 700 Club to include the culture of the Philippines. He launched Operation Blessing Philippines and the Asian Center for Missions, and facilitated the creation of CBN WorldReach centers in Beijing, Hong Kong, India, Indonesia, and Thailand. Gordon returned to the USA in April 1999 to co-host the original 700 Club and, more recently, The 700 Club Interactive program which is seen on Freeform and online. Currently he is producing the new CBN Superbook animated series, which follows the Bible-based adventures of two time-traveling children and their robot friend.'Today, in addition to co-hosting The 700 Club'', Robertson is an executive producer. He also serves on CBN's board of directors. Robertson was the executive producer of the 2016 docudrama Pocahontas: Dove of Peace.

Personal life
He and his wife, Katharyn, live in Virginia with their three children.

His grandfather, Absalom Willis Robertson, was a Democratic U.S. Senator from Virginia.

References

1958 births
Living people
American documentary film producers
American television evangelists
Baptists from Virginia
People from Lexington, Virginia
Lawyers from New York City
Virginia lawyers
Yale University alumni
Washington and Lee University School of Law alumni
Conservatism in the United States